The 2014 Washington Huskies football team represented the University of Washington in the 2014 NCAA Division I FBS football season. Their head coach was Chris Petersen, in his first year at UW after eight seasons as head coach at Boise State. Washington was a member of the North Division of the Pac-12 Conference and the Huskies played their home games on campus at Husky Stadium, in the University District of Seattle. They finished the season 8–6, 4–5 in Pac-12 play to finish in third place in the North Division. They were invited to the Cactus Bowl where they lost to Oklahoma State.

Previous season
The Huskies had a breakout season in 2013, winning more games than they had in the previous twelve seasons, which included a win against BYU in the Fight Hunger Bowl. The offense ended the 2013 season as the most prolific in program history. Junior running back Bishop Sankey broke the school single-season rush yards record as well as the career rushing touchdowns record. Fifth-year senior quarterback Keith Price solidified his spot in the Washington record books as he finished 2013 with career totals of nearly 9,000 passing yards and 75 touchdowns. The off season saw significant change throughout the program as head coach Steve Sarkisian left Washington for USC. Less than a week after Sarkisian's departure Washington announced that Chris Petersen, the highly sought after and respected head coach from Boise State, had been hired as the programs 28th head coach. All but one of Sarkisian's assistants left the program following Petersen's arrival.

Personnel

Coaching staff
Source:

Roster

Recruiting class

Schedule

Rankings

Game summaries

@ Hawaii

Eastern Washington

Illinois

Georgia State

Stanford

@ California

@ Oregon

Arizona State

@ Colorado

UCLA

@ Arizona

Oregon State

@ Washington State

Cactus Bowl

Notes
 February 6, 2014 – Cyler Miles and Damore’ea Stringfellow were suspended indefinitely for violating team rules

References

Washington
Washington Huskies football seasons
Washington Huskies football